Jos is a city in Nigeria's middle belt.

Jos may also refer to:

In Nigeria 
 Jos Plateau, in the centre of Nigeria
 Anglican Diocese of Jos
 Anglican Province of Jos
 Roman Catholic Archdiocese of Jos
 University of Jos
 Yakubu Gowon Airport, also called Jos Airport, serving the city of Jos

People 
 Jos (given name), a list of people with either the given name or nickname

Other uses 
 84340 Jos, a main-belt asteroid
 JOS Watergraafsmeer, a Dutch football club
 Jos Nosy-Bé, a football club based in Nosy Be, Madagascar
 jos, ISO 639-3 code for the Levantine Arabic Sign Language
 J OS, the former name for TempleOS

See also
 Joss (disambiguation)